Tim Hardin 2 is the second album by folk artist Tim Hardin, released in 1967.

History
The original LP release has a long poem on the back cover by Hardin titled "A Question of Birth..."

Tim Hardin 2 contains Hardin's most popular and much-covered composition "If I Were a Carpenter", most notably Bobby Darin, whose version peaked at No. 8 in the US and No. 9 in the UK in 1966.

Tim Hardin 2 was re-released on CD in 1998 by Repertoire along with Tim Hardin 1.

Reception

In his review for AllMusic, music critic Richie Unterberger wrote "Tim Hardin 2 is probably his best single album, on which he eschewed blues nearly entirely and forged a distinctive folk-rock voice..."

It was voted number 430 in the third edition of Colin Larkin's All Time Top 1000 Albums (2000).

Track listing
All songs written by Tim Hardin.

Side one
 "If I Were a Carpenter" – 2:41
 "Red Balloon" – 2:37
 "Black Sheep Boy" – 1:58
 "The Lady Came from Baltimore" – 1:49
 "Baby Close Its Eyes" – 1:52

Side two
 "You Upset the Grace of Living When You Lie" – 1:47
 "Speak Like a Child" – 3:15
 "See Where You Are and Get Out" – 1:12
 "It's Hard to Believe in Love for Long" – 2:17
 "Tribute to Hank Williams" – 3:10

Personnel
Tim Hardin – vocals, guitar, keyboards
Don Peake – arranger
Other musicians uncredited

Production notes
Produced by Charles Koppelman and Don Rubin
Jerry Schoenbaum – production supervision
Val Valentin – director of engineering
Engineered by Doc Siegel
Cover design by David Krieger
Cover photo by Marshall Harmon

References 

1967 albums
Tim Hardin albums
Verve Forecast Records albums
Albums produced by Charles Koppelman